The Tušnica Coal Mine is an open-pit coal mine located in the Tuzla Canton. The mine has coal reserves amounting to 78.9 million tonnes of lignite, one of the largest coal reserves in Europe and the world. The mine has an annual production capacity of 0.2 million tonnes of coal.

References 

Coal mines in Bosnia and Herzegovina
Canton 10